The 2005 Ivy League Baseball Championship Series took place at Joseph J. O'Donnell Field in Cambridge, Massachusetts on May 9, 2005.  The series matched the regular season champions of each of the league's two divisions.  , the winner of the series, claimed their fifth title and the Ivy League's automatic berth in the 2005 NCAA Division I baseball tournament.  It was Harvard's seventh appearance in the Championship Series and the first time they did not face Princeton in the matchup.

Cornell made their first appearance in the Championship Series.

Results

References

Ivy League Baseball Championship Series
Tournament
Ivy League Baseball Championship Series